Rock Band Mobile is a mobile game released as part of the Rock Band series. It is the first title in the series to be released on mobiles.

Soundtrack
The game features songs from Rock Band, Rock Band 2, and songs released as downloadable content for the two.

2009 video games
Mobile games
Rock Band series
Video games developed in the United States
Harmonix games